Birchover is a village and civil parish in the Peak District National Park in Derbyshire, England, five miles north-west of Matlock. At the 2001 Census, it had a population of 362. 
Eagle Tor is a small hamlet on the north western edge of the parish.

History
Birchover is near a number of features of geologic and historic interest: a rock formation called Rowtor Rocks, consisting of numerous tunnels, carvings and caves; several prehistoric monuments, including Doll Tor; and a number of stone circles on Stanton Moor.

Birchover is mentioned in the Domesday book as belonging to Henry de Ferrers, and being worth eight shillings.

In popular culture
Bradley Rocks near Birchover features as the location of the farm in the 1987 film The Princess Bride. The horror writer Joseph Freeman based a story here, 'A Room of his Own', in his first book Love Stories of the Undead (later reprinted in 2008's "This Is My Blood"), and has had articles published in Saccade magazine and a charity anthology called Dog Tales based on real-life eerie events in the area.

Notable people
Eddie Shimwell – former Blackpool football player; first full-back to score at Wembley

See also
Listed buildings in Birchover

References

External links

www.birchovervillage.com

Villages in Derbyshire
Towns and villages of the Peak District
Civil parishes in Derbyshire
Derbyshire Dales